Kahar Kenar-e Keshtali (also Romanized as Kahar Kenār-e Keshtalī; also known as Kahar Kenār and Kar Kenār) is a village in Shahidabad Rural District, Bandpey-ye Gharbi District, Babol County, Mazandaran Province, Iran. At the 2006 census, its population was 1,049, in 268 families.

References 

Populated places in Babol County